Arieșu may refer to one of two places in Maramureș County, Romania:

Arieșu de Câmp, a village in Ardusat Commune
Arieșu de Pădure, a village in Satulung Commune